Fa gao, also called fat pan (發粄) by the Hakka, prosperity cake, fortune cake, Cantonese sponge cake, is a Chinese steamed, cupcake-like pastry. Because it is often characterized by a split top when cooked, it is often referred as Chinese smiling steamed cake or blooming flowers. It is commonly consumed on the Chinese new year. It is also eaten on other festivals, wedding, and funerals by the Hakka people.

Symbolism 
The name of cake, fagao, is a homonym for "cake which expands" and "prosperity cake" as "fa" means both "prosperity" and "expand" and "gao" means "cake".

The Hakka calls the "top split" of the fa ban "xiao", which means smiling which resembles a sign of a coming fortune; therefore, the bigger the "top split", the better.

Preparation 
The cake is made of flour (usually rice flour), leavening (traditionally yeast, but can be chemical leavening), sugar or another sweetener; it is then steamed (instead of baked) on high heat until the top splits into a characteristic "split top" of four segments, or sometimes 3 sections. The batter is typically left to rest for fermentation prior to being steam-cooked.

These cakes, when used to encourage prosperity in the new year, are often dyed bright colours. The most common colours traditionally are white and pink, but it can also be turned brown by adding palm sugar.

Influences in Asia

Singapore 
Chinese Singaporeans use fa gao as offerings during ancestral worship.

Influences outside Asia

Mauritius 
In Mauritius, the fa gao is known as "poutou chinois" or "poutou rouge" ( in French). It is called "pot pan" (發粄/发粄; fa ban) by the Mauritians of Hakka descent. Fa gao in Mauritius is typically pink in colour, and it is eaten on Chinese New Year. However, it is actually sold and eaten all year long.

Gallery

See also
 List of cakes
 List of pastries

References

Chinese New Year foods
Chinese pastries
Thai desserts and snacks
Mauritian cuisine
Rice cakes